Frederick James Hiltz (born 3 December 1953) is a Canadian retired Anglican bishop. From 2007 to 2019, he served as Primate of the Anglican Church of Canada.

Early life and education
Hiltz was born in Dartmouth, Nova Scotia, where he was also raised. He earned his Bachelor of Science degree at Dalhousie University in 1975 (major in biology) and obtained his master of divinity degree at the Atlantic School of Theology in 1978. He received an honorary doctor of divinity degree in 2002 from the University of King's College, Halifax.

Ordained ministry
Hiltz was ordained a deacon on 3 June 1977 and a priest on 29 June 1979. He served in a number of parishes within the Diocese of Nova Scotia and Prince Edward Island: Christ Church, Sydney; Melford-Guysborough; Timberlea-Lakeside; The Cathedral Church of All Saints, Halifax; and St. John's Church, Lunenburg.

In 1994, Hiltz was elected suffragan bishop (an assistant bishop without an automatic right of succession) of the Diocese of Nova Scotia and Prince Edward Island. He was consecrated as a bishop the same year. He became diocesan bishop in 2002. Since 2007, he has been Anglican co-chair of the Anglican-Lutheran International Commission.

Primate

Hiltz was elected primate on 22 June 2007, and installed as primate on 25 June. The Guardian newspaper described him as a "liberal-leaning bishop". He is considered a moderate theological liberal and he opposes the death penalty. He supports, and voted in favour of, the blessing of same-sex unions at the 2007 General Synod that elected him.

In recent years, Hiltz has undertaken a televised joint Christmas message with the National Bishop of the Evangelical Lutheran Church in Canada, carrying into greater fulfillment past declarations of Anglican–Lutheran solidarity. In October 2009, he was reportedly dismayed by Pope Benedict XVI's invitation to welcome groups of disaffected Anglicans into the Roman Catholic Church.

Hiltz announced in January 2018 that he had submitted his notice of intention to resign as primate as of the conclusion of the 42nd General Synod in July 2019.

Residential schools
In 2017, Hiltz issued a strongly-worded rebuke entitled "There was nothing good: An open letter to Canadian Senator Lynn Beyak" who had stated that Canadians ignore the "abundance of good" that happened in residential schools.

Personal life
Hiltz has described his hobbies as the care of animals (two Labrador retrievers and a cat), reading, gardening and woodworking. He is married to Lynne Samways Hiltz. They have one son, Nathan (age 35 ), who is a jazz guitarist and music teacher in Toronto.

References

1953 births
21st-century Anglican archbishops
People from Dartmouth, Nova Scotia
Trinity College (Canada) alumni
Living people
Canadian Anglican priests
Canadian people of German descent
Anglican bishops of Nova Scotia and Prince Edward Island
Dalhousie University alumni
Primates of the Anglican Church of Canada